The 2004–05 Indiana Hoosiers men's basketball team represented Indiana University in the 2004–05 college basketball season. Their head coach was Mike Davis, who was in his fifth season. The team played its home games at Assembly Hall in Bloomington, Indiana, and was a member of the Big Ten Conference.

Indiana finished the season with an overall record of 15–14 and a conference record of 10–6, finishing 4th place in the Big Ten Conference. After missing out on the NCAA tournament for the second consecutive year, Indiana was invited to play in the NIT. However, IU lost in the first round, which ended their season.

2004–05 Roster

Schedule and results

|-
!colspan=9| Regular Season
|-

|-
!colspan=9| Big Ten tournament

|-
!colspan=9| NIT

References

Indiana Hoosiers
Indiana Hoosiers men's basketball seasons
Indiana Hoosiers men's basketball
Indiana Hoosiers men's basketball